The Best Love... Ever! is 11. compilation in series "The Best... Ever!" released by EMI. This compilation was released in early 2008.

Track listing

CD 1
Robbie Williams- "Angels"
Angela McCluskey- "It’s Been Done"
Duran Duran- "Come Undone"
Beverley Knight- "Shape Of You"
Louis Armstrong- "We Have All The Time In The World"
All Saints- "Never Ever"
Blue- "Sorry Seems To Be The Hardest Word"
Jamelia- "Thank You"
Coldplay- "Trouble"
Martine McCutcheon- "Perfect Moment"
Brainstorm- "Maybe"
Melanie C feat. Lisa Lopes- "Never Be The Same Again"
Reamonn- "Supergirl"
Depeche Mode- "Freelove"
Telepopmusik- "Breathe"
Air- "All I Need"
Toni Braxton- "Un-Break My Heart"
Joe Cocker- "You Are So Beautiful"

CD 2
Tina Turner- "Missing You"
Robert Palmer- "Mercy Mercy Me/I Want You (Medley)"
Climie Fisher- "Love Changes (Everything)"
Hot Chocolate- "It Started With A Kiss"
Ultravox- "Dancing With Tears In My Eyes"
Eternal feat. Bebe Winans- "I Wanna Be The Only One"
Mike & The Mechanics- "Over My Shoulder"
Marc Almond & Gene Pitney- "Something’s Gotten Hold Of My Heart"
Bryan Ferry- "Slave To Love"
Billy Idol- "Eyes Without a Face"
Roxy Music- "Jealous Guy"
Andru Donalds- "All Out Of Love"
Spandau Ballet- "True"
Jon Secada- "Just Another Day"
Charles & Eddie- "Would I Lie To You"
Culture Club- Do You Really Want To Hurt Me"
Minnie Riperton- "Lovin’ You"

CD 3
Chet Baker- "My Funny Valentine"
Nat King Cole- "When I Fall In Love"
Matt Monro- "Let There Be Love"
Julie London- "Fly Me To The Moon"
Don McLean- "And I Love You So"
Shirley Bassey- "(Where Do I Begin) Love Story"
George Michael- "I Can’t Make You Love Me"
Stacey Kent- "What a Wonderful World"
Peabo Bryson & Roberta Flack- "Tonight I Celebrate My Love"
Cassandra Wilson- "Fragile"
The Beach Boys- "Then I Kissed Her"
Ive Mendes- "If You Leave Me Now"
Natalie Cole- "This Will Be (An Everlasting Love)"
Nick Cave & Kylie Minogue- "Where The Wild Roses Grow"
Corrine Bailey Rae- "Trouble Sleeping"
Eternal- "Angel Of Mine"
Ray Charles feat. Diana Krall- "You Don’t Know Me"
Norah Jones- "Come Away With Me"
Danny Williams- "Moon River"
Angie Stone- "Wish I Didn't Miss You"

CD 4
Neneh Cherry- "Woman"
Peter Gabriel- "Don’t Give Up"
Roxette- "It Must Have Been Love"
Meat Loaf- "I’d Anything For Love (But I Won’t Do That)"
T'Pau- "China In Your Hand"
Richard Marx- "Right Here Waiting"
The Pretenders- "I’ll Stand By You"
Cutting Crew- "(I Just) Died In Your Arms"
Paula Abdul- "Rush, Rush"
Huey Lewis & The News- "The Power Of Love"
Lenny Kravitz- "Again"
Iggy Pop- "Candy"
Whitesnake- "Is This Love"
Beverly Craven- "I Miss You"
Bill Withers- "Ain't No Sunshine"
Sinéad O'Connor- "Nothing Compares 2 U"

External links
 album description (in Polish)

Love
2008 compilation albums
Pop compilation albums